The Bridge of Dee or Brig o Dee is a road bridge over the River Dee in Aberdeen, Scotland. The term is also used for the surrounding area of the city.  Dating from 1527, the bridge crosses at what was once the City of Aberdeen's southern boundary.

The Bridge of Dee is approximately 32 feet (10 m) above typical water height and consists of seven nearly semicircular ribbed arches, built using granite and Elgin sandstone. Today the bridge carries the main A92 road into Aberdeen from the south.

It was designated a Category A listed structure in 1967, and was also listed as a Scheduled monument until being de-scheduled on 16 February 2009.

George Gordon, 6th Earl of Huntly with his Catholic supporters rebelled against James VI of Scotland and confronted the King at the Brig of Dee on 17 April 1589. There was no battle and Huntly surrendered a few day later. The bridge was the site of a battle in 1639 between the Royalists under Viscount Aboyne and the Covenanters who were led by the Marquess of Montrose and Earl Marischal. This was the only substantial action of the First Bishops' War, and it took place after the peace treaty had already been signed.

History
The bridge was built following a bequest of £20,000 by Bishop William Elphinstone who died in 1514. The bridge was completed by Bishop Gavin Dunbar. It was nearly all rebuilt between 1718 and 1723, and in 1841 was widened from 14 to 26 feet (from four to eight metres) under the direction of Aberdeen City Architect John Smith. Smith also designed the Shakkin' Briggie, and worked on the Bridge of Don with Telford and Wellington Suspension Bridge with Captain Samuel Brown.

The bridge is located near the northern terminus of the Causey Mounth, a medieval drovers' road connecting Stonehaven to Aberdeen.  This ancient trackway specifically connected the Bridge of Dee via Bourtreebush, Muchalls Castle and Stonehaven to the south. The route was that taken by William Keith, 7th Earl Marischal and the Marquess of Montrose when they led a Covenanter army of 9000 men in the first battle of the Civil War in 1639. The following contemporary verse was written about the battle.

 [a large cannon] has made a vow
 [dare to go],

Led by a Covenanter.

The Covenanters that ye see
 [open grassy ground],

A chapel had been built right next to the bridge as a resting place for pilgrims travelling to and from Aberdeen. There appears to be no record showing when it was built but we know that an inventory was made by the Chaplin Sir William Ray. This may have been done prior to a legal battle. Gordon of Abergeldie petitioned Aberdeen town council on 27 February 1530 claiming that the chapel prevented him having easy access to his fishing rights in the river. Having lost the court case Gordon removed one of the buttresses to the bridge to make a footpath for his men to get to the river. Consequently, Aberdeen Town Council, the owners of the bridge, started legal action against him in Edinburgh High Court.

Until 1832, this was the only access to the city from the south. The bridge still features the original 16th-century piers, coats of arms and passing places.

See also
Transport in Aberdeen

Footnotes

Bridges completed in 1527
Areas of Aberdeen
Category A listed buildings in Aberdeen
Road bridges in Scotland
Bridges across the River Dee, Aberdeenshire
Bridges in Aberdeen
1520s establishments in Scotland